Marmorosphax,  is a genus of skinks native to New Caledonia.

Species
Listed alphabetically by specific name.

Marmorosphax boulinda  
Marmorosphax kaala  
Marmorosphax montana  
Marmorosphax taom  
Marmorosphax tricolor  – marble-throated skink

Nota bene: A binomial authority in parentheses indicates that the species was originally described in a genus other than Marmorosphax.

References

 
Lizard genera
Taxa named by Ross Allen Sadlier
Skinks of New Caledonia